TICAD Delegations are those attending the Tokyo International Conference on African Development (TICAD), which is a conference held every five years in Japan with the objective "to promote high-level policy dialogue between African leaders and development partners."   The first four of these conferences were held in Tokyo; and the fifth one was held in nearby Yokohama.

TICAD has been an evolving element in Japan's long-term commitment to fostering peace and stability in Africa through collaborative partnerships.  The exchange of views amongst the conference delegates serves to underscore the case for more, not less assistance from the major world economies.

The TICAD conferences were intended to help to promote high-level policy dialogue amongst African leaders and their development partners.

TICAD-I (1993)
TICAD-I discussed strategies for taking steps toward greater African stability and prosperity. This conference produced the "Tokyo Declaration on African Development."

African Countries
Delegations from 48 African nations participated in the conference, including four heads of state:
 Democratic and People's Republic of Algeria, Slim Tahar Debagha
 People's Republic of Angola, Armando Mateus Cadete
 Republic of Benin, Nicéphore Soglo, President -- Benin Head of State
 Republic of Botswana, G.K.T. Chiepe
 Burkina-Faso, Blaise Compaore, President -- Burkina Faso Head of State
 Republic of Burundi, Bernard Ciza
 Republic of Cameroon, Augustin Frederic Kodock
 Republic of Cape Verde, José Tomás Wahnon de Carvalho Veiga
 Central African Republic, Thierry Bingaba
 Republic of Chad, Ibni Oumar Mahamat Saleh
 Federal Islamic Republic of the Comoros, Caabi El Yachrouti Mohamed
 Republic of Congo, Benjamin Bounkoulou
 Republic of Côte d'Ivoire, Daniel Kablan Duncan
 Republic of Djibouti, Abdou Bolok Abdou
 Arab Republic of Egypt, Said Rifaat
 Republic of Equatorial Guinea, Faustino Nguema Esono
 State of Eritrea, Haile Woldense
 Federal Democratic Republic of Ethiopia, Duri Mohammed
 Gabonese Republic, Jean Mindoumbi
 Republic of the Gambia, Bakary Bunja Dabo
 Republic of Ghana, Jerry John Rawlings, President -- Ghana Head of State
 Republic of Guinea, Ibrahima Sylla
 Republic of Guinea-Bissau, Nelson Gomez Dias
 Republic of Kenya, George Saitoti
 Kingdom of Lesotho, Selometsi Baholo
 Republic of Madagascar, Ramarozaka Maurice
 Republic of Malawi, L.J. Chimango
 Republic of Mali, Mahamar Oumar Maiga
 Islamic Republic of Mauritania, Taki Ould Sidi
 Republic of Mauritius, Nababsing Paramhamsa
 Kingdom of Morocco, Rachidi El Rhezouani
 Republic of Mozambique, Pascoal Manuel Mocumbi
 Republic of Namibia, Hidipo L. Hamutenya
 Republic of Niger, Abdoulkarimou Seyni
 Federal Republic of Nigeria, Isaac Aluko-Olokun
 Republic of Rwanda, Rucogoza Faustin
 Democratic Republic of São Tomé and Príncipe, Mateus Meira Rita
 Republic of Senegal, Papa Ousmane Sakho
 Republic of Seychelles, Danielle de St. Jorre
 Republic of Sierra Leone, Karefa A.F. Kargbo
 Kingdom of Swaziland, A.P. Mkhonza
 United Republic of Tanzania, John Samuel Malecela
 Republic of Togo, Yanja Yenchabre
 Republic of Tunisia, Hannichi Salah
 Republic of Uganda, Yoweri Museveni, President -- Uganda Head of State
 Republic of Zaire, Gbiamango Yewawa
 Republic of Zambia, Ronald Penza
 Republic of Zimbabwe, Nathan M. Shamuyarira

Donor Countries
Representatives from twelve developed countries participated in the conference.  A delegation from what was then known as the Commission of the European Communities was also attended.
 Kingdom of Belgium, Eric Drtyce
 Canada, Huguette Labelle
 Kingdom of Denmark, Helle Degn
 French Republic, Antoine Pouilleute
 Federal Republic of Germany, Harald Ganns
 Republic of Italy, Carmelo Azzará
 Kingdom of the Netherlands, Roland van den Berg
 Kingdom of Norway, Randi Krumsvik Bendiksen
 Portuguese Republic, Jose Briosa e Gala
 Kingdom of Sweden, Alf T. Samuelsson
 United Kingdom of Great Britain and Northern Ireland, Lynda Chalker, Baroness Chalker of Wallasey
 United States of America, George Moose
 European Commission (formerly known as the Commission of the European Communities), Peter Pooley

International Organizations

Co-Organizers

Guest Speakers

Observers (Countries)
Observers from 17 nations were accredited at the conference; and these included:
 Commonwealth of Australia, Geoffrey Miller
 Republic of Austria, Johannes Skriwan
 Republic of Brazil, Paulo Pires do Rio
 People's Republic of China, Sun Guangxiang
 Republic of Finland, Gien Lindolm
 Hellenic Republic, Vassilios Tolois
 Republic of Hungary, István Rácz
 Republic of Indonesia, Poedji Koentarso
 Republic of Ireland, James Anthony Sharkey
 Republic of Korea, Park Jay Son
 Grand-Duchy of Luxembourg, François Bremer
 Malaysia, Datuk H.M. Khatib
 Romania, Tatiana Isticioaia
 Russian Federation, Sergei Krilov
 Republic of South Africa, D.W. Auret
 Kingdom of Spain, Francisco Javier Jimenez de Gregorio
 Swiss Confederation, Peter Reinhardt

Observers (International Organizations)

Observers (NGOs and Others)
Observers from eleven non-governmental organizations (NGOs) and others were amongst the participants at this conference, including:
 African American Institute, Vivian Lowery Derryck
 NGO Forum "Africa Now", Yoko Ozeki
 African National Congress (South Africa), Jerry Matsila
 Africa Watch, William Carmichael
 CARE (relief) (Japan), Kiyohisa Mikanagi
 Carter Center, Richard Joseph
 Crown Agents for Oversea Governments and Administrations, Mark Hughes
 Development Bank of Southern Africa (DBSA), Nick Christodoulou
 South-North Development Institute, Roberto Mizrahi
 Synergos Institute, Peggy Dulany
 Trust for Peace and Prosperity in South and Southern Africa (TPPSSA), Robert Tusenius

Observers (Japanese Organizations)
Observers from five Japanese organizations were participants in the conference, including:
 Japan Export-Import Bank (JEXIM), Kenji Hashimoto
 Institute Developing Economies (IDE), Takehiko Haraguchi
 Japan External Trade Organization (JETRO), Koichi Kobayashi
 Japan International Cooperation Agency (JICA), Takeshi Kagami
 Overseas Economic Cooperation Fund (OECF), Shunro Kageyama

TICAD-II (1998)
TICAD-II discussed poverty reduction in Africa and Africa's fuller integration into the global economy. in 1998.  This conference produced  the "Tokyo Agenda for Action" (TAA), which was intended to become a commonly understood strategic- and action-oriented set of guidelines. Ideas proposed at TICAD-II were also taken up by the G8 in the creation of the Global Fund to fight AIDS, Tuberculosis and Malaria.

African Countries
Delegations from 51 African nations participated in the conference, including eight heads of state:
 Democratic and People's Republic of Algeria, Boudjemaa Delmi
 Repùblica de Angola, António Domingos Pitra Costa Neto
 République du Bénin, Mathieu Kérékou, Président -- Benin Head of State
 Republic of Botswana, Festus Mogae, President -- Botswana Head of State
 Burkina-Faso, Blaise Compaore, Président -- Burkina Faso Head of State
 République du Burundi, Célestin Niyongabo
 Republique du Cameroun, Justin Nidoro
 Repùblica de Cabo Verde, Jose Luis Jesus
 République Centrafricaine, Jean Mete-Yapende
 République du Tchad, Mahamat Saleh Annaadif
 République Fédérale Islamique des Comoros, Salim H. Himidi
 République du Congo, Rodolphe Adada
 République Démocratique du Congo, Badimanyi Mulumba
 République de Côte d'Ivoire, Kablan Duncan Daniel
 République de Djibouti, Hassan Gouled Aptidon, Président -- Djibouti Head of State
 Arab Republic of Egypt, Ibrahim Ali Hassan
 República de Guinea Ecuatorial, Teresa Efua Asangono
 State of Eritrea, Berhane Abreche
 Federal Democratic Republic of Ethiopia, Meles Zenawi
 République Gabonaise, Vincent Boulé
 Republic of The Gambia, Famara Jatta
 Republic of Ghana, Jerry John Rawlings, President -- Ghana Head of State
 République de Guinée, Mamadou Cellou Diallo
 República da Guinée-Bissau, Issufo Sanha
 Republic of Kenya, A. Godana
 Kingdom of Lesotho, L. V. Ketso
 Republic of Liberia, Monie R. Captan
 Great Socialist People's Libyan Arab Jamahiriya, Saad M. Mujber
 République de Madagascar, Lila Ratsifandrihamanana
 Republic of Malaŵi, Cassim Chilumpha
 République du Mali, Alpha Oumar Konaré, Président -- Mali Head of State
 République Islamique de Mauritanie, Sid'El Moctar Ould Naji
 République de Maurice, Rundheersing Bheenick
 Royaume du Maroc, Sâad Eddine Taib
 República da Moçambique, Joaquim Chissano, President -- Mozambique Head of State
 République du Niger, Ibrahim Assane Mayaki
 Federal Republic of Nigeria, T. A. O. Odegbile
 République Rwandaise, Pierre Celestin Rwigema
 República Democrática de São Tomé and Príncipe, Francisco Carlos Afonso Fernandes
 République du Sénégal, Mouhamadou El Moustapha Diagne
 Republic of Seychelles, Jeremie Bonnelame
 Republic of Sierra Leone, James Jonah
 Republic of South Africa, Thabo Mbeki
 Republic of the Sudan, Abdalla Hassan Ahmed
 Kingdom of Swaziland, King Mswati III -- Swaziland Head of State
 United Republic of Tanzania, Fredrick T. Sumaye
 République Togolaise, Barry Moussa Barque
 République Tunisienne, Fathi Merdassi
 Republic of Uganda, Sam Kuteesa
 Republic of Zambia, Edith Nawiki
 Republic of Zimbabwe, Richard C. Hove

Asian Countries
Delegations from 10 Asian nations participated in the conference, including:
 Brunei Darussalam, Dato Malai Haji Ahmad Murad.
 People's Republic of China, Zhang Cixin.
 Republic of India, Siddharth Singh
 Republic of Indonesia, Ir. Zuhal
 Republic of Korea, Shin Kee-bock
 Malaysia, Mahathir bin Mohamad, Prime Minister
 Republic of the Philippines, Jesus I. Yabes
 Republic of Singapore, Zainul Abidin Rasheed
 Kingdom of Thailand, Sukhumbhand Paribatra
 Socialist Republic of Viet Nam, Nguyen Quoc Dung

Donor Countries

International Organisations

Co-organizers

Observers (Countries)

Observers (International Organisation)

Observers (Regional Organisations)

Observers (NGOs)

Observers (Japanese Organisations)

Observers (Others)

TICAD-III (2003)
TICAD III reviewed the achievements of the ten-year TICAD process and discussed the future direction TICAD should take. TICAD-III brought together over 1000 delegates, including 23 heads of state and the Chairperson of the African Union.

Ministers and others
A number of government ministers and others were amongst the participants in the conference, including:

TICAD-IV (2008)
TICAD-IV focused on strategies for better mobilizing the knowledge and resources of the international community in the core areas of: (a) economic growth; (b) human security, including achieving the UN's Millennium Development Goals; and (c) environment/climate change issues.   In addition, TICAD-IV tried to identify possible inter-linkages within the context of the G8 Hokkaidō Tōyako Summit in July 2008.  The event brought together 2,500 participants, including representatives of 51 African countries, among whom were 40 African heads of state and government.  Attendees came from over 70 international organizations.

Heads of State
Invitations were extended to 52 African countries and many heads of state decided to attend, including:

Ministers and others
A number of government officials and non-government organization delegates were amongst the participants in the conference, including:

Observers and others
The UN Development Programme (UNDP), in partnership with the NEPAD Business Group, the UN Conference on Trade and Development (UNCTAD) and the United Nations Industrial Development Organization (UNIDO) made plans in advance to organize on the sidelines of TICAD-IV.  They worked together to create an event which they hoped would attract the attention of the national delegations in Yokohama for TICAD—a meeting which they called Innovative Approaches to Private Sector Development for achieving the Millennium Development Goals (MDGs) in Africa.  The event organizers provided a unique venue for presentations included actual case studies developed by the UN organizations and first-hand testimonials from various local private sector actors who have been beneficiaries or advocates of TICAD-inspired private sector development initiatives in Africa.  Selected new and innovative approaches by global partners were showcased to demonstrate how market-based business activities and private sector investments can help achieve the MDGs.

World Bank President Zoellick participated in a meeting on the global food crisis jointly-organized with the African Union, the World Food Program, the Food and Agriculture Organization and the International Fund for Agricultural Development. This meeting was designed to focus attention on the immediate and medium-to-long term actions needed to tackle the global food crisis.

Some representatives from international non-governmental organizations (NGOs) complained their participation in the ongoing policy dialog between Japan and various African governments was thwarted at TICAD-IV. A group of 55 African, Japanese and international NGOs came uninvited to Yokohama; this was the first time that a 'civil society forum' was incorporated into the compressed agenda.  Six observers were allowed in as observers; and the NGOs construe such limited participation as reflective of a view of NGOs as unimportant.

The shared perspectives of the TICAD-IV's official participants and unofficial observers served to underscore the case for immediate assistance to help Africa's vulnerable economies to weather the current global food and fuel crisis.  Questions remain about how best to achieve such salutary goals.

Notes

References
 Hook, Glenn D., Julie Gilson, Christopher W. Hughes, Hugo Dobson. (2005).  Japan's International Relations: Politics, Economics and Security. London: Routledge. 
 Juma, Monica Kathina, Rafael Velásquez García, and Brittany Kesselman. (2006).  Compendium of Key Documents Relating to Peace and Security in Africa. Praetoria: Praetoria University Law Press. 
 Taylor, Ian and Paul Williams. (2004).  Africa in International Politics: External Involvement on the Continent. London: Routledge.

External links
 TICAD-I:  Index
  Tokyo Declaration on African Development
 TICAD-II:  Index
  Tokyo Agenda for Action
 TICAD-III:  Index
  TICAD Tenth Anniversary Declaration
  Summary by the Chair of TICAD-III
 TICAD-IV:  Index
  Yokohama Declaration
  Yokohama Action Plan (HTML),  (PDF)
  TICAD Follow-up Mechanism
  Summary by the Chair of TICAD-IV
 TICAD-V: [Ministry for Foreign Affairs web site—to be constructed]

Politics of Africa
Foreign relations of Japan